Thornton Waldo Burgess (January 17, 1874 – June 5, 1965) was an American conservationist and author of children's stories. He was sometimes known as the Bedtime Story-Man, after his newspaper column Bedtime Stories. By the time he retired, he had written more than 170 books and 15,000 stories for the daily newspaper column.

Biography

Early life and career
Born January 17, 1874 in Sandwich, Massachusetts, on Cape Cod, Burgess was the son of Caroline F. Haywood and Thornton W. Burgess Sr., a direct descendant of Thomas Burgess, one of the first Sandwich settlers in 1637. Thornton, Sr., died the same year his son was born, and the young Thornton, Jr. was brought up by his mother in Sandwich. They lived in humble circumstances. As a youth, he worked tending cows, picking trailing arbutus (mayflowers) or berries, shipping water lilies from local ponds, selling candy, and trapping muskrats. William C. Chipman, one of his employers, lived on Discovery Hill Road, a wildlife habitat of woodland and wetland. This habitat became the setting of many stories in which Burgess refers to Smiling Pool and the Old Briar Patch.

Graduating from Sandwich High School in 1891, Burgess briefly attended a business college in Boston from 1892 to 1893, living in Somerville, Massachusetts, at that time. But he disliked studying business and wanted to be an author. He relocated to Springfield, Massachusetts, where he accepted a job as an editorial assistant at the Phelps Publishing Company. His first stories were written using the pseudonym "W. B. Thornton".

Burgess married Nina Osborne in 1905, but she died in childbirth a year later, leaving him to raise their son alone. It is said that he began writing bedtime stories to entertain his young son, Thornton III. Burgess remarried in 1911; his wife Fannie had two children by a previous marriage. The couple later bought a home in Hampden, Massachusetts, in 1925 that became Burgess' permanent residence in 1957. His second wife died in August 1950. Burgess returned frequently to Sandwich, which he always claimed as his spiritual home. Many of his childhood experiences and the people he knew there influenced his interest and were the impetus for his concern for wildlife.

Old Mother West Wind
Burgess used his outdoor observations of nature as plots for his stories. In Burgess' first book, Old Mother West Wind (1910), the reader meets many of the characters found in later books and stories. The characters in the Old Mother West Wind series include Peter Rabbit (known briefly as Peter Cottontail), Jimmy Skunk, Sammy Jay, Bobby Raccoon, Little Joe Otter, Grandfather Frog, Billy Mink, Jerry Muskrat, Spotty the Turtle, Old Mother West Wind, and her Merry Little Breezes.

Additional publications
For the next 50 years, Burgess steadily wrote books that were published around the world in many languages, including French, Gaelic, German, Italian, Spanish, and Swedish. Collaborating with him was his illustrator and friend Harrison Cady who was born and raised in Gardner, Massachusetts, and thereafter of New York and Rockport, Massachusetts. Peter Rabbit was created by British author and illustrator Beatrix Potter, prompting Burgess to note, "I like to think that Miss Potter gave Peter a name known the world over, while I with Mr. Cady's help perhaps made him a character."

From 1895 to 1962, Burgess wrote "nearly 900" stories, natural science articles, and poems for magazines, including 201 children's stories for People's Home Journal magazine. For over 16 years from May 1913 through the magazine's demise following its final December 1929 issue, Burgess published a children's story in every issue of People's Home Journal magazine.

From 1912 to 1960, without interruption, Burgess wrote his syndicated daily newspaper column (via the George Matthew Adams Service), Bedtime Stories.

Radio broadcasts
From 1912 to 1960, Burgess also broadcast on the radio. His Radio Nature League radio series began at WBZ (AM), then located in Springfield, in early January 1925. Burgess broadcast the program from the studio at the Hotel Kimball on Wednesday evening at 7:30 p.m. Praised by educators and parents, the program had listeners and members in more than 30 states at its peak. Burgess' Radio Nature League disbanded briefly in August 1930, but he continued to give radio talks for WBZ concerning conservation and the humane treatment of animals.

Final publications
In 1960, Burgess published his last book, Now I Remember, Autobiography of an Amateur Naturalist, depicting memories of his early life in Sandwich as well as his career highlights. That same year, Burgess, at the age of 86, had published his 15,000th newspaper column.

In 1998, Burgess' granddaughter, Frances B. Meigs, published My Grandfather, Thornton W. Burgess : An Intimate Portrait, detailing her childhood growing up under his wing.

Death
He died on June 5, 1965, at the age of 91. His son had died suddenly the year before.

Awards and accomplishments
Burgess was actively involved with conservation efforts. Some of his projects during his lifetime included:

 Helping to pass laws protecting migrant wildlife.
 "The Green Meadow Club" for land conservation programs.
 "The Bedtime Stories Club" for wildlife protection programs.
 "Happy Jack Squirrel Saving Club" for War Savings Stamps & Bonds.
 The Radio Nature League broadcast from WBZA in Boston and WBZ in Springfield, Massachusetts.

For his efforts, Burgess also received:

 An Honorary Literary Degree in 1938, from Northeastern University  
 A special gold medal from the Museum of Science in Boston, for "leading children down the path to the wide wonderful world of the outdoors" 
 The Distinguished Service Medal of the Permanent Wildlife Protection Fund.

Legacy and influence

Wildlife Sanctuaries and Museum
After his death, the Massachusetts Audubon Society purchased Burgess' Hampden home and established the Laughing Brook Wildlife Sanctuary at that location; the house is listed on the National Register of Historic Places.

The Thornton W. Burgess Society operates the Green Briar Nature Center in East Sandwich, Massachusetts. The Society's Thornton W. Burgess Museum in Sandwich closed to the public October 2012.

Other
 A middle school in Hampden, Massachusetts was named after Burgess in honor of his work for conservation.  The school opened in 1967 and was closed by the Hampden-Wilbraham Regional School District in June 2018.
 In the early 1970s, an anime television adaptation of some of Burgess' works was produced by a Japanese animation studio and was later distributed worldwide. The English language translation was entitled Fables of the Green Forest.
 John Crowley's novel Little, Big (1980) includes allusions to locations and characters in Burgess' stories.

Books

References

Sources
  Library of Congress Catalog No. 60-11637

Further reading
 Lowrance, Christine Palmer. Nature's Ambassador: The Legacy of Thornton W. Burgess, Schiffer Publishing,

External links

 
 
 
 
 
 Works by Thornton Burgess at Hathi Trust Digital Library
 The Thornton W. Burgess Society Official website

1874 births
1965 deaths
American children's writers
American conservationists
People from Hampden, Massachusetts
People from Sandwich, Massachusetts